The ochre-rumped antbird (Drymophila ochropyga) is a species of bird in the antbird family Thamnophilidae. It is endemic to Brazil, in the east and south east of the country in the Atlantic Forest Mountains EBA.

The plumage varies by sex. The male has a white throat with black streaks, a black head with a white stripe above the eye and streaked cheeks, grey back and blackish wings, black tail, rufous flanks and belly, and a light rufous rump. The female is similar but with buff streaks in the crown, olive-grey back and duller and less streaked front.

The ochre-rumped antbird feeds on insects and other arthropods, foraging in pairs or in family groups forage from ground level to  up into the trees. They are active foragers, hopping forward and then pausing to scan for prey, frequently flicking their tail as they do so.

The species is still relatively common, but it has a limited range and specialised habitat requirements, and the species is in particular is vulnerable to bamboo die off.

References

ochre-rumped antbird
Birds of the Atlantic Forest
Endemic birds of Brazil
ochre-rumped antbird
Taxonomy articles created by Polbot